Patsy Maegerman (born 11 July 1972) is a Belgian former racing cyclist. At the 1994 UCI Road World Championships she won the silver medal in the women's road race. She finished in second place in the Belgian National Road Race Championships in 1994.

References

External links

1972 births
Living people
Belgian female cyclists
Sportspeople from Aalst, Belgium
Cyclists from East Flanders
20th-century Belgian women